Avangard is a rural locality (a village) in Itkulovsky Selsoviet of Ishimbaysky District, Bashkortostan, Russia. The population was 7 .

Geography 
Avangard is located 33 km southeast of Ishimbay (the district's administrative centre) by road. Podlesny is the nearest rural locality.

Ethnicity 
The village is inhabited by Russians.

References 

Rural localities in Ishimbaysky District